Jan Bol (March 4, 1924-February 11, 2010) was a Dutch sailor who represented his country at the 1968 Summer Olympics in Acapulco. Bol, as crew on the Dutch Dragon, took the 10th place with helmsman Cor Groot and fellow crew member Pieter de Zwart.

References

External links
 

 
 
 
 
 
 
 
 

1924 births
2010 deaths
People from Aalsmeer
Dutch male sailors (sport)

Sailors at the 1968 Summer Olympics – Dragon
Olympic sailors of the Netherlands
Sportspeople from North Holland
20th-century Dutch people